Herwig Röttl (born 30 January 1968 in Waiern) is a retired Austrian athlete who specialised in the sprint hurdles. He represented her country at the 1992 and 1996 Summer Olympics, as well as two outdoor and three indoor World Championships.

His personal bests are 13.41 seconds in the 110 metres hurdles (+1.4 m/s, Bad Homburg  1992) and 7.64 seconds in the 60 metres hurdles (Feldkirchen 1996).

Competition record

1 Did not start in the semifinals

References

1968 births
Living people
Austrian male hurdlers
Athletes (track and field) at the 1992 Summer Olympics
Athletes (track and field) at the 1996 Summer Olympics
Olympic athletes of Austria
People from Feldkirchen in Kärnten
World Athletics Championships athletes for Austria
Sportspeople from Carinthia (state)